Tystion vs Allfa Un is the second release by the Welsh band Tystion.

Track listing
 Dan Y Belt
 Isymwybod

See also

Music of Wales

External links
  Fitamin Un Discography

Welsh-language albums
1996 albums
Tystion albums